Daniel Felgenhauer (born 10 May 1976) is a German former footballer who is now assistant manager of MSV Duisburg.

References

External links
 

1976 births
Living people
People from Hof, Bavaria
Sportspeople from the Upper Palatinate
German footballers
SpVgg Greuther Fürth players
Borussia Mönchengladbach players
Rot Weiss Ahlen players
Bundesliga players
2. Bundesliga players
Association football defenders
Footballers from Bavaria